Vilma is a feminine given name. 

Vilma may also refer to:

 Jonathan Vilma, American National Football League player
 Vilhelmina Vilma Bardauskienė (born 1953), Lithuanian former long jumper
 Vilma (Philippine TV program), which was aired from 1986 to 1995
 Vilma (grasshopper), a genus of insect in the subfamily Batrachideinae